The Making of Plus One is a 2010 British-Canadian comedy film about the independent filmmaking industry. The film was set and shot at the Cannes Film Festival and takes a satirical look at the film industry's obsession with celebrity. It was written and directed by Mary McGuckian and stars Michael Eklund, Suzan-Lori Parks, Lothaire Bluteau, Geraldine Chaplin, Donna D'Errico, Jordi Mollà and Jennifer Tilly.

Plot
The production team of a new film, headed by hopeful director (Parks) and a conniving producer Dave Dallas (Eklund) hold several meetings at the Cannes Film Festival with the hope of achieving financial backing for their film.

Cast
Michael Eklund as Dave Dallas
Suzan-Lori Parks as Skye Brown - the director
Lothaire Bluteau as Gil - the production designer
Geraldine Chaplin as Geri - the casting director
Donna D'Errico as Frances Money - the lawyer
Jordi Mollà as Victor - the D.O.P.
Amanda Plummer as Kim Owens - the accountant
John Sessions as Derek - the line producer
Sara Stockbridge as Rusty Robinson - the writer
Jennifer Tilly as Amber
Katie Boland as Starlet

References

External links
 

2010 films
Canadian comedy films
English-language Canadian films
British comedy films
Films about filmmaking
2010 comedy films
2010s English-language films
2010s Canadian films
2010s British films